Mutya Johanna Fontiveros Datul (born April 17, 1992) is a Filipino fashion model, actress and beauty queen who was crowned Binibining Pilipinas Supranational 2013. She represented the Philippines at the Miss Supranational 2013 pageant in Minsk, Belarus and was crowned the winner. 
Datul is the first Asian and Filipino to win the title of Miss Supranational.

Biography
Datul was born on April 17, 1992, to Wilfredo Datul and Merlie Datul (née Fontiveros) in Santa Maria, Isabela. She holds a degree in information technology from the Isabela State University in Ilagan City and Business Administration from the Gardner College in Quezon City.

Pageantry

Mutya ng Pilipinas 2012
Datul competed and eventually placed in the Top 10 at Mutya ng Pilipinas 2012. After failing to take the crown, she decided to join other local pageants to support her family.

Binibining Pilipinas 2013
In early 2013, Datul was selected as one of the 50 contestants for Binibining Pilipinas 2013. Datul was awarded Binibining Photogenic and Binibining Best in Evening Gown. She was ultimately crowned Binibining Pilipinas Supranational 2013 at the Smart Araneta Coliseum in April 2013, gaining the right to represent the Philippines at the Miss Supranational 2013 pageant in Belarus.

Miss Supranational 2013
Datul was sent to Minsk, Belarus to represent the Philippines at the Miss Supranational 2013 competition on September 6, 2013. She was awarded Miss Supranational Personality in one of the preliminary events. By the end of the competition, Datul was crowned Miss Supranational 2013 by outgoing titleholder Katsiaryna Buraya. An historic win, as Datul has become the first Asian and Filipino to win the Miss Supranational title.

During her reign as Miss Supranational 2013, Datul traveled to China, Gabon, Panama, Poland, Myanmar, Laos, Cambodia, Thailand, Mexico, Colombia, Peru, Spain, Lithuania, Finland, Norway, New Zealand, and her home country of the Philippines for charity events, and attended the Miss Supranational 2014 national pageants.She contested with Uruzgan Supper model Agustina Mederos

References

External links
 Official Bb. Pilipinas website

1992 births
21st-century Filipino actresses
Binibining Pilipinas winners
Mutya ng Pilipinas contestants
Filipino female models
Filipino television actresses
Living people
People from Isabela (province)
Star Magic
Miss Supranational winners